Ibrahim Khalil (May 5, 2000, Al-Hasakah, Syria) a Yazidi singer and songwriter.

Biography 
Ibrahim Khalil was born on May 5, 2000, in Al-Hasakah in the Syrian Arab Republic in a family of musicians. He made his first musical steps at the age of 9. At the age of 11 he began to study music in Al-Haskaha music school.

Ibrahim has been living in Germany since 2012. He attended the Clemens-Brentano European School there.

Musical career 
Ibrahim Khalil released the first music video in 2012 entitled "Beje beje". Later the singer released the songs "Heyo" and “Bivinm". Ibrahim Khalil is also a songwriter. He wrote songs for Yezidi singers Jangir Broyan and Arthur Safoyan.

His style of music is varied, including pop ballads as well as traditional Yezidi folk music.

Discography

Singles 

 2016 Feb – "Ay Dil" (My Heart)
 2016 Feb – "Keçka Êzidî" (Yazidi Girl)
 2016 Sep – "Shems Xayeme" (Sunshine)
 2017 Feb – "Êz Çi Bikîm Min Hez Bikî" (What should I do to love myself)
 2017 Jun – "Seva Te" (For you)
 2017 Oct – "Tu Tu Tu" (You you you) (With Amar Zakharov, David Odi)
 2018 Jan – "Şaya Artur" (Artur's wedding)
 2018 Jun – "Ez Berfim" (Beautiful winter snow)
 2018 Dec –  "Potpori/Govend" (Yazidi mashup)
 2019 May – "Romanci" (Romantic)
 2019 Jun – "Yazidi Mashup" (With Ishkhan Dengbej)
 2019 Oct – "Ezdixana Mine" (My Yazidi people)
 2019 Dec – "Bvinm" (I want to see you)
 2019 Mar – "Le Le Le" (With Vle Khaloyan)
 2020 Jun – "Kûda Ez Herîm" (Where should I go?)
 2020 Julc – "Miran & Anna"

Music videos

References

External links 

 
 Ibrahim Khalil on YouTube
 Ibrahim Khelil on Discogs

2000 births
Living people
21st-century Syrian male singers
Yazidi people
Folk singers
Male pop singers
People from Al-Hasakah
Syrian Yazidis